The Citadel New Military Cemetery is  a military cemetery located in the Somme region of France commemorating British and Commonwealth soldiers who fought in World War I. It contains mainly burials made by field ambulances before the Battle of the Somme, although it was also used by some units in the final months of the war. The cemetery is managed by the Commonwealth War Graves Commission.

Location 
The cemetery is located near a geographic feature called "the Citadel" in an area known as the "Happy Valley", approximately 2.5 kilometers south of the village of Fricourt on the D147 road. Fricourt is approximately 5 kilometers east of the town of Albert, France.

Establishment of the Cemetery 
The cemetery was begun by French troops in August 1915. It was used by various Commonwealth units up until November 1916. Many burials date from the capture of Fricourt by the British 17th (Northern) Division on 2 July 1916. The cemetery was reopened once in August 1918. The cemetery was designed by Sir Edwin Lutyens and Arthur James Scott Hutton.

Statistics 
There are a total of 380 Commonwealth burials in the cemetery, of which 363 are identified and 17 are unidentified. All identified casualties are British.

References 

World War I cemeteries in France